Leonard Daniel Andreas Terfelt, originally Jonson, born 20 August 1976 in Hagersten, is a Swedish actor.

Career
Terfelt made his film debut in 2000 in Jalla! Jalla!. In 2007, he had the recurring role of Niillas Kimmel in the TV series Hook. The same year, he starred in the film Leo. He was nominated for a Guldbagge in 2008 for this role. In 2008-2009 he served the role of Roger Andersson in the TV series Innocent convicted. In 2013 he played the role of Hans von Enke in five films about Kurt Wallander. In 2014, he starred in the film Flugparken against, among others, Sverrir Gudnason.  He also appeared in The Bridge (2011 TV series) in the 4th and last season, as William (Leonora's father), in 2018.

Terfelt has worked at the Royal Dramatic Theatre. In 2004 he made the role of Roger in the Outside my window, the 2005 Agis in the triumph of love and 2007 Lawyer Helmer in A Doll's House. In 2006, he starred in the Radio Theatre Performance threats against her life. He has also worked at the National Theatre.

Filmography
 2000 - Jalla! Jalla!
 2005 - Four Weeks in June
 2007 - Hook (TV series)
 2007 - Leo
 2008 - 2009 - Oskyldigt dömd (Eng.: Verdict Revised) (TV series)
 2011 - Anno 1790 (TV series)
 2012 - Arne Dahl: Europa Blues (TV series)
 2012 - Studio Six
 2013 - Wallander - The Troubled Man
 2013 - Wallander - The betrayal
 2013 - Wallander - Missing
 2013 - Wallander - The Arsonist
 2013 - Wallander - The Sad Bird
 2014 - Real People (TV series)
 2014 - Flugparken
 2018 -  The Bridge  (TV series)
 2021 -  Young Royals  (TV series)

References

Living people
1976 births
Swedish male actors